Miroslav Jenča is the Assistant Secretary-General for Europe, Central Asia and Americas in the United Nations Department of Political Affairs. Prior to this appointment of March 2015 by United Nations Secretary-General Ban Ki-moon, Miroslav Jenča served as an ambassador of Slovakia to Mexico (2000).

Between 2004 and 2007 he led the Organization for Security and Co-operation in Europe Center in Tashkent (Uzbekistan). Jenča held the position also during the tragic events in the Uzbek town of Andijan in 2005.

Based on his previous experience in Central Asia gained during his stay in Tashkent, in 2008 UN Secretary-General Ban Ki-moon appointed Jenča Special Representative of the Secretary-General (SRSG) and Head of the newly established United Nations Regional Center for Preventive Diplomacy for Central Asia, UNRCCA.

References

Sources 

Slovak diplomats
Ambassadors of Slovakia to Mexico
Living people
Slovak officials of the United Nations
Year of birth missing (living people)